Mangromedes kochi, syn. Nilus kochi, is a species of spiders in the family Pisauridae. It is found in Queensland, Australia.

References

External links 

Pisauridae
Spiders described in 1951
Spiders of Australia
Arthropods of Queensland